Local elections held in Iligan City on May 9, 2016 as part of the Philippine general election. The resident voters elected officials for the elective local posts in the city: the mayor, vice mayor, the one congressman, and twelve councilors.

At the end of filing of certificates of candidacy (COC) last October 16, 2015, a total of 77 hopefuls have filed their COC for city's 15 elective positions: 10 are running for congressman, 5 for mayor, 2 for vice-mayor, and 60 for city councilors.

Candidates for Lone District Representative

Vicente Belmonte, Jr. (LP) is the incumbent. However, he is already on his last term and ineligible for reelection. Instead, he decided to run for mayor. However, he later dropped his candidacy.

Three candidates from the ruling party are vying for the lone congressional seat; they are acting mayor Ruderic Marzo, former mayor Lawrence Lluch-Cruz and current councilor Frederick Siao. At the end, Cruz luckily received the certificate of nomination and acceptance (CONA) from Liberal Party. Later, Ruderic Marzo withdrew his candidacy for congressman.

Candidates for Mayor
Suspended mayor Celso Regencia (NPC) is the incumbent. Vice Mayor Ruderic Marzo (LP) serves as the acting mayor.

On November 16, 2015, Vicente Belmonte Jr. withdrew his candidacy for mayor citing security reasons. He later named incumbent vice-mayor Ruderic Marzo (LP) as his substitute, who filed his certificate candidacy on December 7, 2015.

Candidates for Vice Mayor
Acting mayor Ruderic Marzo is the incumbent. Jemar Vera Cruz is a priest running for vice-mayor of the city. Parties are as stated in their certificates of candidacy.

Candidates for City Councilors
Below is the complete list of candidates for city councilors.

|bgcolor=black colspan=5|

References

External links
COMELEC - Official website of the Philippine Commission on Elections (COMELEC)
NAMFREL - Official website of National Movement for Free Elections (NAMFREL)
PPCRV - Official website of the Parish Pastoral Council for Responsible Voting (PPCRV)

Elections in Lanao del Norte
2016 Philippine local elections
Politics of Iligan